Betty McDonald (born 1950) is an Australian former cricketer who played as a left-arm medium bowler. She appeared in one Test match for Australia in 1976, and six One Day Internationals for International XI at the 1973 World Cup. She played domestic cricket for Western Australia and South Australia.

References

External links
 
 

Living people
1950 births
Cricketers from Western Australia
Australia women Test cricketers
International XI women One Day International cricketers
Western Australia women cricketers
South Australian Scorpions cricketers